This is a list of electoral results for the Electoral district of Kenwick in Western Australian state elections.

Members for Kenwick

Election results

Elections in the 2000s

Elections in the 1990s

Elections in the 1980s

References

Western Australian state electoral results by district